The Oskar von Miller Tower is a tower for meteorological measurements located in Garching, Germany. Built in 2007–2009, it is named after Oskar von Miller and operated by the Technical University of Munich.

A concrete structure surrounded by a coat of acrylic glass, the Oskar von Miller Tower has a height of 62 metres and carries measuring devices to all directions 5, 10, 20, 35 and 50 metres above ground. 1350 LEDs display the logo of the Technical University of Munich, while 3750 display the actual weather data. It replaced a guyed mast used for the same purpose on the area.

References 

Technical University of Munich
Towers in Germany
Towers completed in 2010
Garching bei München